Rhododendron hancockii (滇南杜鹃) is a rhododendron species native to Guangxi and Yunnan, China, where it grows at altitudes of . The flowers are white with yellowish flecks.

References
 "Rhododendron hancockii", Hemsley, Bull. Misc. Inform. Kew. 1895: 107. 1895.

hancockii
Flora of China
Plants described in 1895